The 2008 Formula BMW Europe season was the first season of a new open wheel racing series that resulted by the merging of the Formula BMW Germany and Formula BMW UK championships. Formula BMW Europe is a continental series for junior drivers, whose mission is to develop talented young drivers and introduce them to auto racing.

The season started on April 27, 2008 at the Circuit de Catalunya in Barcelona and ended on September 14 at Monza. All rounds were staged on the undercard of the Formula One World Championship except Zolder, which was a support race of the Masters of Formula 3.

After sixteen rounds, Mexican Esteban Gutiérrez became the first Formula BMW Europe champion.

Teams and drivers
 All cars are powered by BMW engines, and Mygale FB02 chassis. Guest drivers in italics.

Calendar

Results

Drivers 
Points are awarded as follows:

† — Drivers did not finish the race, but were classified as they completed over 90% of the race distance.

Teams

Notes

References

External links 
 BMW-Motorsport.com

Formula BMW seasons
BMW
2008 in European sport
BMW Europe